Szymon Stanisław Giżyński (born 8 March 1956 in Częstochowa) is a Polish politician.

Biography
He graduated from the Faculty of Philology at the University of Silesia in Katowice. After 1990, he was a member of the Centre Agreement, the Movement for the Commonwealth,  AWS. In 2001 he joined the Law and Justice. He was the last voivode of Częstochowa in 1997–1998. In 2006 he started for the office of the President of Częstochowa, obtaining the fourth result (12.56%).

In 2001, 2005, 2007, 2011, 2015 and 2019 he obtained a parliamentary mandate in the Częstochowa district.

References

External links
Szymon Stanisław Giżyński - parliamentary page - includes declarations of interest, voting record, and transcripts of speeches.

1956 births
Living people
People from Częstochowa
PAX Association members
Solidarity Electoral Action politicians
Centre Agreement politicians
Law and Justice politicians
Members of the Polish Sejm 2001–2005
Members of the Polish Sejm 2005–2007
Members of the Polish Sejm 2007–2011
Members of the Polish Sejm 2011–2015
Members of the Polish Sejm 2015–2019
Members of the Polish Sejm 2019–2023
University of Silesia in Katowice alumni